The women's foil was one of seven fencing events on the fencing at the 1956 Summer Olympics programme. It was the seventh appearance of the event. The competition was held on 29 November 1956. 23 fencers from 11 nations competed.

Competition format

The competition used a pool play format, with each fencer facing the other fencers in the pool in a round robin. Bouts were to 4 touches. Barrages were used to break ties necessary for advancement (touches against were the first tie-breaker used to give ranks when the rank did not matter). However, only as much fencing was done as was necessary to determine advancement, so some bouts never occurred if the fencers advancing from the pool could be determined.

Results

Round 1

The top 4 fencers in each pool advanced to the semifinals.

Pool 1

Pool 2

Pool 3

Semifinals

The top 4 fencers in each pool advanced to the final.

Semifinal 1

Semifinal 2

Final

Orban-Szabo defeated Sheen in the round-robin, but had to face her again in a barrage after finishing tied at 6–1 (Orban-Szabo had lost to Garilhe). In the barrage, Sheen was the victor to win the gold medal.

References

Foil women
1956 in women's fencing
Fen